The list of shipwrecks in April 1836 includes ships sunk, foundered, wrecked, grounded, or otherwise lost during April 1836.

1 April

2 April

3 April

4 April

5 April

7 April

8 April

9 April

10 April

11 April

12 April

13 April

14 April

15 April

17 April

18 April

19 April

22 April

25 April

27 April

28 April

29 April

Unknown date

References

1836-04